Manuela Mölgg (born 28 August 1983) is a retired alpine ski racer from Italy, a specialist in the technical events of slalom and giant slalom.

Biography
Born in Bruneck, South Tyrol, Mölgg made her World Cup debut at age 17 in December 2000 and gained her first podium in November 2004. She has 14 World Cup podium finishes and appeared in two Olympics and six World Championships. At the 2009 Alpine World Ski Championships in Val-d'Isère Mölgg took the lead in the slalom after the first run but was disqualified from the second after missing the final gate of the course, having kept her lead at the intermediate checkpoints before the finish line. She is the sister of Manfred Mölgg (b.1982), a racer on the Italian men's team.

At the 2018 Winter Olympics of Pyeongchang she led after the first run of the giant slalom, and then finished the race in 8th position.

After the 2018 World Cup Finals in Åre, Mölgg announced her retirement from World Cup skiing.

Mölgg has been in a relationship with fellow alpine skier Werner Heel since 2009: as of 2018 the couple were engaged.

World Cup results

Season standings

Race podiums

 14 podiums (12 GS, 2 SL)

World Championship results
She has competed in seven World Championships and her best finish is sixth place, in the slalom and giant slalom in 2011, and again in the GS in 2017.

Olympic results  
Mölgg has made four Olympic teams and her best finish was eight in the giant slalom in 2018.

See also
Italian skiers most World Cup podiums

References

External links
 
 Manuela Moelgg at the Italian Winter Sports Federation (FISI) 
 Moelgg.com official site of Manfred & Manuela Mölgg 

1983 births
Living people
Sportspeople from Bruneck
Ladin people
Italian female alpine skiers
Alpine skiers at the 2006 Winter Olympics
Alpine skiers at the 2010 Winter Olympics
Alpine skiers at the 2014 Winter Olympics
Alpine skiers at the 2018 Winter Olympics
Olympic alpine skiers of Italy
Alpine skiers of Fiamme Gialle